Social Security Board may refer to:
 Social Security Board (Belize)
 Social Security Board (Myanmar)
 Social Security Board (United States), now the Social Security Administration